Dirk Böttcher (13 October 1921 – 23 January 2011) was a German printer master, author and president of the association of Friends of the Historisches Museum Hannover.

Life 
Böttcher was born in Hanover. In 1948 he became a master printing teacher and received the Betriebleiter diploma of the Meisterschule für Deutschlands Buchdrucker in Munich. Until 1964, Böttcher was head of a printing shop in São Paulo. He then was associate of the Carl Küster printing company in Hanover. He was a long-term president of the association of Friends of the Historisches Museum Hannover.

Böttcher died at age 89 in Hanover..

Publications 
Böttcher is co-author of the following works:
 Klaus Mlynek, Waldemar R. Röhrbein (ed.): . Von den Anfängen bis in die Gegenwart. Schlütersche Verlagsgesellschaft, Hanover 2009, .
 Dirk Böttcher, Klaus Mlynek, Waldemar R. Röhrbein, Hugo Thielen (ed.): . Von den Anfängen bis in die Gegenwart. Schlütersche Verlagsgesellschaft, Hanover 2002, .
Helmut Knocke, Hugo Thielen (authors), Dirk Böttcher, Klaus Mlynek (ed.): . Handbuch und Stadtführer. Schäfer, Hannover 1994, .
Helmut Knocke, Hugo Thielen (authors), Dirk Böttcher, Klaus Mlynek (ed.): Hannover. Kunst- und Kulturlexikon. Handbuch und Stadtführer. 4th, updated and extended edition. Zu Klampen, Springe 2007, .
 Eine Druckerei im Wandel. Meine kleine Berufsgeschichte vornehmlich in der Carl-Küster-Druckerei von 1886. In , Neue Folge 54, 2000, .

References

External links 
 
 Jens Böttcher: Herzlich Willkommen bei der Carl Küster Druckerei GmbH on druckerei-kuester.de

German printers
1921 births
2011 deaths
People from Hanover
 German expatriates in Brazil